Viktoria Square (originally Kyriakou Square) is a large square in the Municipality of Athens, Greece between 3 September and Aristotelous streets. It was renamed Viktoria in honor of the Queen of the United Kingdom on the occasion of the annexation of the Ionian Islands to Greece in 1864, as a gift to the enthronement of the Queen's nephew, Prince Christian William Ferdinand Adolf George of Denmark, later George I of Greece. Underneath the square passes the Athens Electric Railway at the homonymous stop. The square crosses the streets of Hayden, 3 September and Aristotelous; in its center is the sculptural complex Theseus saves Hippodamia by Johannes Pfuhl (1846–1914).

Around the square, the homonymous district has been developed. Since the 1940s the district has been one of Athens' best and most sought after, comparable to Kolonaki. On its streets there are important examples of classical modernism, such as the Spathari block (Mavrommatia street), the Sarantopoulos block (27 Derigni street), as well as the buildings on Heiden 1 and 2. The luxurious apartments of these buildings were addressed to the bourgeoisie of Athens at the time, since they provided a variety of amenities and had high quality architectural elements.

Gradually, the area began to decline, largely due to its abandonment by its original inhabitants. The neighborhood today is generally regarded as degraded and facing problems of crime.

Since the worst days there has been an improvement in the neighborhood around the square, which is linked to the general upgrading of downtown Athens.

References

Gallery

Squares in Athens
Monuments and memorials to Queen Victoria